Baldwin of Jerusalem may refer to:

 Baldwin I of Jerusalem (also Baldwin I of Edessa, 1058?–1118),  first king of Jerusalem
 Baldwin II of Jerusalem (also Baldwin II of Edessa, died 1131),  King of Jerusalem 
 Baldwin III of Jerusalem (1130–1162),  King of Jerusalem from 1143 to 1163.
 Baldwin IV of Jerusalem (1161–1185),  King of Jerusalem
 Baldwin V of Jerusalem (1177–1186), King of Jerusalem from 1185 to 1186

See also
 Baldwin (name)